Mack (stylised as MACK) is an independent art and photography publishing house based in London. Mack works with established and emerging artists, writers and curators, and cultural institutions, releasing around 40 books per year. The publisher was founded in 2010 in London by Michael Mack.

Details
Mack was founded in 2010 in London by Michael Mack, who previously worked as managing director of Steidl, founding the SteidlMack imprint.

Mack takes part in various art and book fairs, showcasing new titles, participating in talks, and organising artist book signings. These annual events include The London Book Fair in March; AIPAD in NYC in April; LA Art Book Fair in April; PhotoLondon in May; Rencontres d'Arles, in July; the NY Art Book Fair in September; Frankfurt Book Fair in October; Paris Photo in November.

In 2011, Michael Mack was awarded an Honorary Doctorate of Arts by the University of Plymouth for his contribution to art publishing.

Awards for Mack titles
Deutsche Börse Photography Prize 2009 – won by Paul Graham's a shimmer of possibility.
Paris Photo/Aperture Foundation 2011 – Best PhotoBook from the last fifteen years –  won by Paul Graham's a shimmer of possibility.
Rencontres d'Arles 2011 Contemporary Book Award – won by Taryn Simon's A Living Man Declared Dead and Other Chapters.
Rencontres d'Arles 2012 Author Book Award – won by Christian Patterson's Redheaded Peckerwood.
Deutsche Börse Photography Prize 2013 – won by Adam Broomberg & Oliver Chanarin's War Primer 2.
Leica Oskar Barnack Award 2014 – won by Martin Kollar's Field Trip.
ICP Infinity Award 2014 from the International Center of Photography – won by Adam Broomberg & Oliver Chanarin's Holy Bible.
Paris Photo 2016 Photobook of the Year  –  won by Gregory Halpern's ZZYZX.
Paris Photo/Aperture Foundation 2018 Photography Catalogue of the Year – won by Ursula Schulz-Dornburg's The Land in Between. 
Rencontres d'Arles 2018 Photo Text Book Award – won by Adam Broomberg & Oliver Chanarin's War Primer 2.
Richard Schlagman Art Book Awards 2019 Contemporary Art Award – won by Thomas Demand's The Complete Papers.

First Book Award
In 2012, Mack established the First Book Award, in collaboration with the National Media Museum, Bradford and the Wilson Centre for Photography, London. This annual photography publishing award is open to photographers who have not previously had a book published by a third party publishing house (this does not include self-published print on demand projects). The call for submissions emphasises a predilection for projects conceived in book form: works that find a voice through the book. The award is not an open submission – but instead each year, a diverse array of international nominators are asked to recommend suitable projects. Submissions open in January, the winner is announced in April, and the winning work is published by Mack and the National Media Museum in June.

Winners
2012: Anne Sophie Merryman, Mrs. Merryman's Collection.
2013: Paul Salveson, Between the Shell.
2014: Joanna Piotrowska, FROWST.
2015: Ciarán Óg Arnold, I went to the worst of bars hoping to get killed. but all I could do was to get drunk again.
2016: Sofia Borges, The Swamp.
2017: Emmanuelle Andrianjafy, Nothing's in Vain.
2018: Hayahisa Tomiyasu, TTP.
2019: Jerome Ming, Oobanken.
2020: Damian Heinisch, 45.
2021: Marvel Harris, Marvel.

References

External links

First Book Award
Michael Mack describes his photobook publishing (video)
Interview with Michael Mack by Paper Journal 

Companies based in the London Borough of Lewisham
2010 establishments in England
Publishing companies established in 2010
Visual arts publishing companies
Book publishing companies based in London
Photography companies of the United Kingdom